Sayala may refer to:
 Sayala, Rajasthan, village in Rajasthan, India
 Sayala, Parbhani, village in Parbhani taluka of Parbhani district, Mahashtra, India
 Sayala, Palam, village in Palam taluka of Parbhani district, Mahashtra, India
 Sayala Mace, a ceremonial mace from Predynastic Egypt.
 Sayala (Egypt), archaeological site in Nubia, where Sayala Mace was found